Corey Conners (born January 6, 1992) is a Canadian professional golfer currently playing on the PGA Tour. Conners has played on PGA Tour Canada, PGA Tour Latinoamérica, and the Web.com Tour.

Amateur career 
Conners was raised in Listowel, Ontario. He won the 2010 Ontario Amateur and was runner-up to Gunn Yang at the 2014 U.S. Amateur conducted at Atlanta Athletic Club. Conners played in the 2015 Masters Tournament where he missed the cut.

Professional career 
Following the 2015 Masters Conners turned professional, and played in the RBC Canadian Open in 2016. In December 2016, Conners tied for 42nd at the Web.com Tour qualifying tournament. By making the top 45, he earned a place on the Web.com Tour in 2017.

In March 2018, Conners held the 54-hole lead at the Valspar Championship in Florida, one stroke ahead of Justin Rose, Brandt Snedeker and Tiger Woods. In the fourth round, Conners shot 77 and finished T16. Conners ended the season 130th in the FedEx Cup, five spots out of full status for the 2019 season.

In October 2018, Conners finished second to Cameron Champ in the PGA Tour's Sanderson Farms Championship in Jackson, Mississippi, winning $475,200.

On April 7, 2019, Conners won the PGA Tour's Valero Texas Open by two strokes over Charley Hoffman, earning the final place in the 2019 Masters Tournament. Due to his conditional status, Conners had to play in a Monday qualifying event, where he earned the final spot after a six-man playoff. He became the first Monday qualifier to win on the PGA Tour since Arjun Atwal at the 2010 Wyndham Championship. The first place prize was $1,350,000. Conners finished the 2019 regular season in 31st place. He finished 21st at The Northern Trust and 7th at the BMW Championship, which earned him a spot at the Tour Championship.

Conners continued his strong play into the 2019-20 PGA season with 10 top-25 finishes, and one top-10 finish at the Zozo Championship. He finished the season with a FedEx Cup ranking of 53rd. Through the first 20 events of the 2021 season Conners had finished top-10 on seven occasions, and top-25 13 times: Most notably a 7th-place finish at the Players Championship and 8th place at the Masters. Conners was the leader after the first round of the 2021 PGA Championship with a first round score of 67 (five under par). However, Conners fell out of contention in the second round shooting a 3-over-par 75. He finished tied for 17th.

Conners qualified for the 2020 Summer Olympics in Tokyo.

Conners qualified for the International team at the 2022 Presidents Cup; he lost all four of the matches he played.

Personal life
Conners is the son of Mike and Janet Conners. He has a twin sister, Nicole, and a younger sister, Sarah. He is married to Malory (Martin) Conners.

Amateur wins
2010 Toyota Junior World Cup (tie), Ontario Amateur
2012 Mid-American Conference Championship, Gopher Invitational
2013 Gopher Invitational
2014 Jones Cup Invitational, General Hackler Championship (tie), Mid-American Conference Championship, Tailhade Cup (Argentina)
2015 Lake Macquarie Amateur

Source:

Professional wins (1)

PGA Tour wins (1)

Results in major championships
Results not in chronological order in 2020.

CUT = missed the half-way cut
"T" indicates a tie for a place
NT = No tournament due to COVID-19 pandemic

Summary

Most consecutive cuts made – 3 (2020 Masters – 2021 PGA)
Longest streak of top-10s – 1 (three times)

Results in The Players Championship

CUT = missed the halfway cut
"T" indicates a tie for a place
C = Canceled after the first round due to the COVID-19 pandemic

Results in World Golf Championships

1Cancelled due to COVID-19 pandemic

NT = No tournament
"T" = Tied
Note that the Championship and Invitational were discontinued from 2022.

Team appearances
Amateur
Eisenhower Trophy (representing Canada): 2012, 2014

Professional
Aruba Cup (representing PGA Tour Canada): 2016
Presidents Cup (representing the International team): 2022

See also
2017 Web.com Tour Finals graduates

References

External links

Canadian male golfers
PGA Tour golfers
Olympic golfers of Canada
Golfers at the 2020 Summer Olympics
Korn Ferry Tour graduates
Kent State Golden Flashes men's golfers
Golfing people from Ontario
Golfers from Florida
People from Perth County, Ontario
People from Palm Beach Gardens, Florida
1992 births
Living people